Gabriel Burtănete (born 19 February 2002) is a Romanian artistic gymnast. In 2019, he won the gold medal in the vault at the 2019 Junior World Artistic Gymnastics Championships held in Győr, Hungary. In 2020, Burtănete earned the gold medal in the vault final of the Junior European Artistic Gymnastics Championships in Mersin, Turkey.

In 2018, he represented Romania at the 2018 Summer Youth Olympics held in Buenos Aires, Argentina. In the boys' vault event he finished in 5th place in the final.

His twin brother, Robert, is also an artistic gymnast who competes for the Romanian national team.

References

External links 
 

Living people
2002 births
People from Buzău
Romanian male artistic gymnasts
Gymnasts at the 2018 Summer Youth Olympics
Medalists at the Junior World Artistic Gymnastics Championships
Twin sportspeople
Romanian twins
21st-century Romanian people